2006 Empress's Cup Final was the 28th final of the Empress's Cup competition. The final was played at National Stadium in Tokyo on January 1, 2007. Tasaki Perule FC won the championship.

Overview
Tasaki Perule FC won their 4th title, by defeating Okayama Yunogo Belle 2–0 with Tomoko Suzuki goal.

Match details

See also
2006 Empress's Cup

References

Empress's Cup
2006 in Japanese women's football